Erasing David is a 2010 dramatized documentary (docufiction) film from the United Kingdom. Stating that as of today the UK is "one of the three most intrusive surveillance states in the world, after China and Russia", director and performer David Bond tries to put the system to the test. After anonymously setting up private investigators Cerberus Investigations Limited to trace him, he tries to disappear.

External links
 
 
 How to disappear completely - The Independent published this article by director David Bond
 Can you disappear in surveillance Britain? - The Times

2010 films
British docudrama films
British drama films
2010 drama films
2010s English-language films
2010s British films